William Wedderburn,  (October 12, 1834 – April 5, 1918) was a lawyer, journalist, judge and political figure in the Province of New Brunswick, Canada. He represented the city of Saint John in the Legislative Assembly of New Brunswick from 1870 to 1882.

He was born and raised in Saint John, the son of Alexander Wedderburn, a Scottish immigrant, and Jane Heaviside, from London, England. He studied law with John Hamilton Gray and was called to the bar in 1858. In that same year, he married Jeannie Vaughan. In 1873, he was named Queen's Counsel. Also in 1873, Wedderburn was named a commissioner to consolidate the statutes for the province. Wedderburn served as president of the St. John Mechanics' Institute,  was a Grand Master for the Freemasons and a prominent member of the Sons of Temperance. He served as speaker for the provincial assembly from 1875 to 1878, when he was named provincial secretary. Wedderburn was an early supporter of Confederation. In 1882, he was named a judge for the court for Kings and Albert counties.

References 
The Canadian parliamentary companion and annual register, 1880, CH Mackintosh
History of New Brunswick, James Hannay (1909)

External links 
 The Wedderburns of New Brunswick

1834 births
1918 deaths
Lawyers in New Brunswick
Judges in New Brunswick
Canadian King's Counsel
Members of the Legislative Assembly of New Brunswick
Members of the Executive Council of New Brunswick
Speakers of the Legislative Assembly of New Brunswick
Politicians from Saint John, New Brunswick
Provincial Secretaries of New Brunswick